Papagos may refer to:

Alexandros Papagos, a Greek field marshal during World War II
 Tohono O'odham, a Native American group formerly known as the Papago
 An uncommon name for Papagou, a suburb in Athens, Greece which is named after Alexandros Papagos